The 1937 DePaul Blue Demons football team was an American football team that represented DePaul University as an independent during the 1937 college football season. The team compiled a 5–1–2 record and outscored all opponents by a total of 124 to 35. The team played its home games at Wrigley Field and Mills Stadium in Chicago. Ben Connor was the head coach.

Schedule

References

DePaul
DePaul Blue Demons football seasons
DePaul Blue Demons football